Pierce is an unincorporated community in Green County, Kentucky, United States.  It lies along Route 218 southwest of the city of Greensburg, the county seat of Green County.  Its elevation is 801 feet (244 m).

References

Unincorporated communities in Green County, Kentucky
Unincorporated communities in Kentucky